Parahepomidion nitidum is a species of beetle in the family Cerambycidae. It was described by Per Olof Christopher Aurivillius in 1916.

References

Phrissomini
Beetles described in 1916